Jacoby Glacier is a steep glacier draining the eastern slopes of the Ames Range between Mount Boennighausen and Mount Andrus, in Marie Byrd Land, Antarctica. It was mapped by the United States Geological Survey from surveys and U.S. Navy air photos, 1959–65, and was named by the Advisory Committee on Antarctic Names for William J. Jacoby, a driller at Byrd Station, 1968–69.

References

Glaciers of Marie Byrd Land
Ames Range